Samuel Filmore West (October 5, 1904 – November 23, 1985) was a center fielder in Major League Baseball who played for three different teams from  to . He was born in Longview, Texas.

West entered the majors in 1927 with the Washington Senators, playing six years for them before moving to the St. Louis Browns (1933–1938), again with Washington (1938–1941), and the Chicago White Sox (1942). His most productive season came in 1931 when he posted a career-high .333 batting average and reached career highs in slugging percentage (.481), hits (175), doubles (43), triples (13), and rbi (91).

During his career, West collected a .300 average during eight seasons; led AL outfielders in putouts twice, double plays three times, and assists once, and four times was considered in the AL Most Valuable Player vote. Although he played with Washington during ten seasons, he missed the American League pennant-winning team that lost the 1933 World Series to the New York Giants after being traded to the Browns in exchange for Goose Goslin. 
 
In a sixteen-season career, West was a .299 hitter (1838-for-6148) with 75 home runs and 838 RBI in 1753 games, including 934 runs, 347 doubles, 101 triples, 53 stolen bases, 696 walks, a .371 on-base percentage, and a .425 slugging percentage.
Defensively, he posted a .983 fielding percentage. Following his playing career, West served in the U.S. Army during World War II. After discharge from the service, he spent three years as a coach with the Senators.
                                                                                                                                                         
West died in Lubbock, Texas at age 81.

See also
List of Major League Baseball career triples leaders
List of Major League Baseball single-game hits leaders

References
Sam West - Baseballbiography.com
The Baseball Page
Baseball Reference
Browns All-Stars
Retrosheet
The Deadball Era
Society for American Baseball Research (SABR) 

1904 births
1985 deaths
American League All-Stars
Baseball players from Texas
Birmingham Barons players
Chicago White Sox players
Major League Baseball center fielders
Monroe Drillers players
Roswell Giants players
St. Louis Browns players
Sportspeople from Lubbock, Texas
Sulphur Springs Saints players
Sulphur Springs Spartans players
United States Army personnel of World War II
Washington Senators (1901–1960) coaches
Washington Senators (1901–1960) players